In season 2005–06, Clyde competed in their sixth consecutive season in the Scottish First Division. Graham Roberts was appointed as new manager, after Billy Reid left to join Hamilton Academical. Roberts appointed ex-Celtic player Joe Miller as his assistant.

Clyde finished fifth in the Scottish First Division. They went out of the Scottish League Cup in the third round the Scottish Cup in the fourth round and the Scottish Challenge Cup in the first round.

It was a season to enjoy for the fans, as they watched their team take the lead against Rangers at Ibrox in the Scottish League Cup, though they were eventually defeated after extra-time. They beat Celtic 2–1 in the Scottish Cup, which was the club's biggest victory for years.

Transfers

May to December

In:

Out:

January to April

In:

Out:

Squad

Results

Friendlies

Scottish First Division

Scottish Challenge Cup

Scottish League Cup

Scottish Cup

Canadian tour

Player statistics

League table

Notes

 

Clyde
Clyde F.C. seasons